Neuropathy may refer to:
Peripheral neuropathy, a condition affecting the nerves of the peripheral nervous system
 Cranial neuropathy, any condition affecting cranial nerves
 Auditory neuropathy, any condition affecting the auditory nerve
 Optic neuropathy, any condition affecting the optic nerve (including "Leber's hereditary optic neuropathy")
 Diabetic neuropathy, peripheral neuropathy due to diabetes mellitus
 Familial amyloid neuropathies, a rare group of autosomal dominant neuropathies of autonomic (and sometimes also sensory or motor) nerves
 Giant axonal neuropathy, a rare neurological disorder that causes disorganization of neurofilaments
 Hereditary neuropathy with liability to pressure palsy (HNPP), a peripheral neuropathy that affects the sensory and muscle nerves
 Neuropathy, ataxia, and retinitis pigmentosa (NARP), a condition that causes a variety of signs and symptoms chiefly affecting the nervous system
 Neuropathy target esterase, a protein (enzyme) that catalyzes (increases the rates of) chemical reactions
 Organophosphate-induced delayed neuropathy, a neuropathy caused by killing of neurons in the central nervous system, especially in the spinal cord, as a result of acute or chronic organophosphate poisoning
 Polyneuropathy, a neurological disorder that occurs when many peripheral nerves throughout the body malfunction simultaneously

Contrasts
 Neuropathy contrasts with terms describing problems in other parts of the nervous system such as:
 Encephalopathy
 Myelopathy
 Radiculopathy
 Neuromuscular junction disease
 Myopathy

See also
 Charcot–Marie–Tooth disease
 Neuropathia mucinosa cutanea
 Neuropathic arthropathy
 Neuropathic pain
 Neuropathic ulcer
 Neuropathology
 Neuropathology and Applied Neurobiology, medical journal